The Manchester South District Railway (MSDR) was a British railway company that was formed in 1873. It was formed by a group of landowners and businessmen in the south of Manchester, England, with the purpose of building a new railway line through the city's southern suburbs.

After some commercial difficulties, the MSDR line was eventually built by the Midland Railway and opened in 1880. A section of the line became part of the Cheshire Lines Committee and it was later absorbed into British Rail in 1948. The line was closed in the 1960s as part of the Beeching cuts. In the 21st century the line was partially reopened as part of the Manchester Metrolink network, and today forms the South Manchester Line.

History

The mid-19th century was a time of rapid expansion of Britain's railway network and new lines were being planned around major cities such as Manchester.

A group of landowners in South Manchester formed the Manchester South District Railway to develop a line through the local area. By creating a new rapid link to the economic centre of Manchester they hoped to attract prosperity to the growing outer districts. Their intended route would run from a planned junction at Cornbrook in central Manchester to Alderley, Cheshire, passing through the southern Lancashire villages of Chorlton-cum-Hardy, Withington and Didsbury, and on into Cheshire through Gatley and Styal. The MSDR company was sanctioned by Act of Parliament on 5 August 1873, but progress on the new line stalled for years.

Development of the delayed MSDR line was eventually made possible as a result of the fierce competition between two railway companies on the lucrative long-distance Manchester-London route. The first line between the two cities had been opened in 1840 by the Manchester and Birmingham Railway, and the company was absorbed six years later into the LNWR. The LNWR's competitor, the Midland Railway (MR) sought to capture the profitable Manchester-London market by opening up its own railway line. Its route through the Peak District proved difficult to construct, and lacking its own line into central Manchester, the MR was forced to share the congested Manchester London Road railway station with the LNWR for several years. In 1876, the Midland was served notice on its access to London Road, and faced with eviction, the company was compelled to develop a new route into the city.

In its quest for its own independent line into the city, the MR considered an 1864 scheme of the Manchester and Cheadle Railway to build a railway line from Old Trafford to Heaton Mersey, passing through the suburbs of Old Trafford, Hough End and longside the River Mersey via Church of St James, Didsbury to a junction with the Stockport, Timperley and Altrincham Junction Railway. This proposal was eventually aborted, but the Manchester South District Railway's 1873 scheme emerged as a viable plan.

To build the line, the Midland tried to set up a joint venture with the Great Northern and the Manchester, Sheffield and Lincolnshire Railways, but disagreements over funding delayed the project. The Midland eventually took the decision to take over the entire MSDR scheme alone.  Powers to build the line were transferred to the Manchester & Stockport Railway in 1876, and an Act of Parliament vested the MSDR in a joint railway, the Sheffield and Midland Railway Companies' Committee on 11 August 1877.

The Midland was also a partner in another joint railway, the Cheshire Lines Committee (CLC) which was building its own railway terminus, . A new junction was constructed at Throstle Nest near Cornrook, connecting the new MSDR to the CLC's Liverpool–Manchester lines; this would enable trains from the MSDR line to run into central Manchester and terminate at Central Station. The Manchester South District Line opened on 1 January 1880. More importantly for the Midland, this development opened up a new long-distance route to the south, and the Midland Railway closed its operation at London Road station on 1 August 1880, moving all its services to Central Station. Initially, trains terminated at a temporary Free Trade Hall Station until the main station opened in July 1880.

From 1923, the MR was absorbed into the LMS, and after 1948 the line became part of British Rail. In the postwar period, suburban services on the South District Line declined in frequency.

Closure
When the former LNWR line from  became the principal route for London express trains, the South District Line lost its importance; the route and its stations were listed for closure in the Beeching cuts. Passenger services on the Manchester South District Line ceased on 2 January 1967, although it continued to be used for freight trains and as a relief line for passenger express trains until the line was fully closed in 1969.

After closure, the suburban stations fell derelict and were eventually demolished. Manchester Central was mothballed and eventually repurposed as an exhibition centre, the G-Mex in 1986.

Metrolink re-opening
The Manchester South District Line lay derelict for several decades. In 1984, Greater Manchester Council and GMPTE announced the Project Light Rail scheme to develop a new light rail/tram system by re-opening a number of disused railway lines in the region, including part of the former MSDR line as far as East Didsbury. The first phase of the Manchester Metrolink system opened in 1992, but conversion of the MSDR line to light rail did not begin until the early 2010s. Tram tracks were laid along the former trackbed, and new trams stops were constructed, mostly at new locations, as the former Midland Railway stations had been demolished.

Route

From its opening in 1880, local services were operated on the Manchester South District Line between Manchester ansd Stockport: 

Withington

.

References

Citations

Sources

External links

Early British railway companies
Pre-grouping British railway companies
Rail transport in Greater Manchester
Rail transport in Cheshire
Midland Railway
Manchester, Sheffield and Lincolnshire Railway
Former railway lines converted to Manchester Metrolink lines
Railway companies established in 1873
Railway lines opened in 1880
1873 establishments in England
Cheshire Lines Committee Lines
1873 establishments in the United Kingdom